The Hobbit is a 1967 fantasy animated short film by Gene Deitch and the first attempt to adapt J.R.R. Tolkien's 1937 novel The Hobbit (upon which it is loosely based) into a film. At less than twelve minutes, it is also one of the shortest films based on Tolkien's work. It has no connection to the 1977 Rankin/Bass animated film or Peter Jackson's 2012-2014 three-part live-action film.

Plot

The film is short and lacking in detail, barely resembling the original story with the exception of the encounter with the trolls (renamed "Groans") and Bilbo Baggins's encounter with a creature called Goloom. A Princess Mika is introduced to avoid having Bilbo as a bachelor.

A dragon named Slag has ravaged a town in Dale called Golden Bells, though General Torin Oakenshield and Princess Mika survive. They ask a wizard, Gandalf, for help; he tells them that the Great Book prophesies Slag's death, for which they must have a Hobbit. They visit Bilbo at his home in Hobbiton; he refuses to help, but Gandalf and Mika persuade him. They set off and meet two Groans; Bilbo (not Gandalf, who doesn't come with them) tricks them to fight each other, and at dawn the Groans turn into trees.

Bilbo vanishes from his companions. He has fallen into a hole in the mountains occupied by Grablins, landing in Goloom's lake. He finds Goloom's magic ring and escapes. He crosses Mirkwood and reaches the Lonely Mountain. He manages to steal the Arkenstone from Slag's hoard, and uses a bow to shoot it into Slag's heart, killing him. Bilbo marries Mika and they return together to Hobbiton.

Production

Producer William L. Snyder of Rembrandt Films had the film rights to Tolkien's work from 1964 to 1967, and intended to make a feature-length animated film of The Hobbit, working with Deitch as animator and Bill Bernal as writer. A proposed deal with 20th Century-Fox fell through, so Snyder asked Deitch to make a 12-minute version, quickly and cheaply.

The short is only slightly animated; it consists mostly of camera movements over still pictures, with some cut-outs moving on the screen. Rushing through production, Snyder "premiered" the film on June 30, 1967 — the last day before his film rights would expire. He paid people a dime to give back to him, and then come and watch the film in a small Manhattan projection room. He had them sign statements that they had paid to see a Hobbit film, which allowed Snyder to retain the film rights. He then sold the rights back to Tolkien for approximately $100,000.

The film remained unknown to Tolkien fans until 2012, when Deitch posted on his blog about the film's history. He stated that the film had been produced and released in 1966, but subsequent document discoveries confirmed that this in fact happened in 1967.

See also
Limited animation
The Lord of the Rings - Ralph Bakshi's 1978 animated feature adaptation
Cutout animation

References

External links
 Film on DailyMotion
 Film on YouTube
 Cartoon Brew article on said rediscovered adaptation

American animated short films
English-language Czech films
Films directed by Gene Deitch
Rediscovered American films
Rembrandt Films short films
Films based on The Hobbit
1960s rediscovered films
1960s English-language films
1960s American films
1960s British films